Angie Tsang Sze-Man (born 1978) is a Hong Kong police officer, former wushu athlete and former child actress. She was best known as an Asian Games silver medalist for Wushu in 2006.

Background
Tsang first started by learning lion dances at the age of 10, before moving on to Wushu on the advice of Mr Ha Tak-kin, her martial arts instructor. In the same year, she won her first gold medal in the Hong Kong Wushu Age Group Competition. She was later selected by the Hong Kong Wushu Union to receive special training which paved for her to represent the country in world events.

As a child actress, Tsang portrayed a young Wong Fei-hung in the 1993 Hong Kong martial arts film Iron Monkey. She also made an appearance in the 1996 film Combo Cops.

As a member of Hong Kong's national wushu team, Tsang won a silver medal in the women's nangun (southern staff) event of World Wushu Championships in Hong Kong in 1999. She was a bronze-medal winner in the same event in 2001 in Yerevan.

Tsang joined the Hong Kong Police Force in January 2003.

Tsang eventually won a gold medal in 2005 in Hanoi, Vietnam.

Tsang won a silver medal in the Wushu taolu contest at 2006 Asian Games in Doha, Qatar.

Personal life
Tsang was married to a fellow policeman Sidney Chan, with whom she had a daughter Winsome in 2008, and later a son Waylon.

In September 2018, Tsang announced her plans to retire from martial arts in the following year.

Filmography

Films

References

External links

1978 births
Hong Kong child actresses
Living people
Hong Kong police officers
Hong Kong wushu practitioners
Asian Games medalists in wushu
Hong Kong film actresses
Wushu practitioners at the 2006 Asian Games
Wushu practitioners at the 2002 Asian Games
Asian Games silver medalists for Hong Kong
Medalists at the 2006 Asian Games